The Quebrada Seca River is a river in Peru with a length of 29.3 km, and a slope of 7.2 percent.

See also
 Amazonas Region

Rivers of Peru